Brindisi Marittima was a railway station in Brindisi, Italy. The station was opened in 1870 and closed in 2006. It was located on the short Brindisi–Brindisi Marittima railway.

History
The station was located at the port of Brindisi and connected the railway with the boat to Greece.

Train services
The station was an important link between western Europe and Greece. Trains served the station with destinations such as Paris, Cologne and Vienna.

Until 1994 it was served by the express "Parthenon" Athens-Paris.

Present day
The closure of the railway has resulted in the creation of a car park at the site of the railway station.

References

Railway stations in Apulia
Railway stations opened in 1870
Railway stations closed in 2006
Buildings and structures in the Province of Brindisi